Esfandiyār or Espandiyār is a legendary Iranian hero and one of the characters of Ferdowsi's Shahnameh. He was the son and the crown prince of the Kayanian King Goshtasp and Queen Katāyoun. He was the grandchild of Kay Lohrasp. 

Esfandiyār is best known for the tragic story of a battle with Rostam described in Ferdowsi's epic Shahnameh (Epic of Kings). It is one of the longest episodes in  Shahnameh and is one of its literary highlights.

Etymology

In the Shahnameh

According to the epic Shahnameh, Esfandiyār was the Crown Prince and a Divine Warrior of ancient Iran who supported the prophet Zartosht (Zarathustra), enabling him to spread the religion of Zoroastrianism. He also fought against many apostates and enemies of Zartosht to do so. In return, Zartosht gave Esfandiyār a chain and armor from Heaven. The armor made him invincible and the chain had the power to bind anyone, even a demon or evil magician, making them unable to escape. Zartosht also gave a Divine blessing to the prince and declared that anyone who would spill the blood of Esfandiyār (killed him) shall suffer a cursed life of bad omens until the day he dies and even after death would be condemned to hell.

Esfandiyār's father, Goshtasp, had promised to give him the throne if he manages to repel an invasion in far-off provinces. Esfandiyār successfully carries out the order. Upon his return, Esfandiyār's father informs him that during his absence the king of Turan Arjaasb had rebelled and attacked Iran's capital and abducted Esfandiyār's two sisters. Goshtasp sends Esfandiyār on another mission to suppress the rebellion and retrieve the abducted princesses.

Esfandiyār sets out in haste passing through a difficult and dangerous path with 7 different battles which would be known later as 7 labors of Esfandiyār. These are:

1. Slaying two monstrous wolves.

2. Slaying two man-eating lions.

3. Slaying a Dragon.

4. Killing a wicked enchantress.

5. Fighting and killing a Simurgh and its two offspring.

6. Braving a three-day-long storm.

7. Crossing a desert.

Esfandiyār then successfully infiltrates the Fortress of Arjaasb known as Roin Dej. (lit. Invincible Fortress) Esfandiyār then kills Arjaasb, rescues his sisters and conquers the fortress. Upon Esfandiyār's return to Iran, Goshtasp, who did not want to part with his throne, hedges once again.

Although Goshtasp is aware of a prediction that foretells the death of Esfandiyār at the hand of Rostam, he compels the young hero to go and bring the aging Rostam in chains for his arrogance and disrespect toward the king, promising that upon completing this mission he will give the throne to Esfandiyār and retire. Esfandiyār initially protests, reminding his father of Rostam's fame, great age, and services to the dynasty, but eventually complies with his father's wishes and sets out towards Rostam's home.

Upon reaching the home of Rostam, Esfandiyār delivers the message, but Rostam refuses to comply to be put in chains, only agreeing to accompany the young prince to his father's palace. Esfandiyār insists, but Rostam, making numerous other concessions, stands his ground and the two eventually meet in single combat. In the subsequent battle, the invincible Esfandiyār is unaffected by Rostam's blows while Rostam is seriously wounded by Esfandiyār's arrows, which had diamond arrowheads and could easily pierce through Rostam's armor. Pleading respite to dress his wounds, Rostam withdraws.

Rostam's father Zaal who was raised by the legendary bird Simurgh (apparently there were two different Simurghs in Shahnameh, one which is slain in 7 labours of Esfandiyār and the other one which raised Zaal and lived in mountains of Iran) summons Simurgh by burning a feather given to him from Simurgh herself to ask help for curing his son. And Simurgh benevolently cures both Rostam and his horse Rakhsh who was also wounded by Esfandiyār's arrows. and then Rostam learns from the Simurgh that the only weapon that can affect Esfandiyār is a shot to the eyes from a special double-headed arrow, made from the branch of a tamarisk tree near the Persian Gulf.

Simurgh also warns Rostam about the fate that awaits the killer of Esfandiyār and asks Rostam to consider surrendering to the Prince, and since he is a divine prince there would be no shame in surrendering to him. But Rostam refuses to accept either the shame of surrendering or being chained by anyone.  Upon making this decision, Simurgh carries Rostam to the tamarisk tree, where he fashions the double head arrow with a feather of Simurgh and a twig of the tamarisk tree. When the battle resumes the next morning, Esfandiyār is blinded by a shot through the eye.

Before dying, Esfandiyār tells Rostam not to blame himself: it was the false promise of his father and the Arrow of Simurgh that killed him. Esfandiyār tells Rostam that Goshtasp should be guilty as the real murderer.

See also
 Battle of Rostam and Esfandiyār
 Esfandiyār's Seven Labors 
 The heel of Achilles
 The shoulder of Sigurd (Siegfried)
 The thighs of Duryodhana
 Nadr ibn al-Harith - Contemporary of Muhammad, told stories about Rostam and Esfandiyar.

References

Further reading 
 
 
 

Kayanians
Shahnameh characters
Iranian folklore